Touring Band 2000 is the second DVD release by the American alternative rock band Pearl Jam, culled from performances from the North American legs of the band's 2000 Binaural Tour. It was released on VHS and DVD on May 1, 2001.

Overview
DVD extras include a montage of the band's European tour (set to "Yellow Ledbetter"), a montage of outtakes of the band (set to "Smile"), and the Matt Cam feature with which you can watch selected songs from the camera focused on drummer Matt Cameron. In addition, it has three unreleased instrumentals ("Thunderclap", "Foldback", and "Harmony") and the videos for "Do the Evolution" and "Oceans", the latter of which had never been released in the U.S. AllMusic gave it four and a half out of a possible five stars. Allmusic staff writer JT Griffith called it "one of the first truly essential music DVDs." Touring Band 2000 has been certified platinum by the RIAA.

Track listing
Information taken from various sources.
"Long Road"
10/21/00, Desert Sky Pavilion, Phoenix, Arizona
"Corduroy"
9/4/00, Merriweather Post Pavilion, Columbia, Maryland
"Grievance"
10/15/00, Cynthia Woods Mitchell Pavilion, The Woodlands, Texas
"Animal"
10/28/00, Blockbuster Pavilion, Devore, California
"Gods' Dice"
10/31/00, Shoreline Amphitheatre, Mountain View, California
"Evacuation"
8/12/00, Ice Palace, Tampa, Florida
"Given to Fly"
10/11/00, Riverport Amphitheater, Maryland Heights, Missouri
"Dissident"
10/8/00, Alpine Valley Music Theatre, East Troy, Wisconsin
"Nothing as It Seems"
11/6/00, KeyArena, Seattle
"Even Flow"
9/1/00, Blockbuster Music Entertainment Centre, Camden, New Jersey
"Lukin"
10/24/00, Greek Theatre, Los Angeles
"Not for You"
10/24/00, Greek Theatre, Los Angeles
"Daughter"/"It's OK"
8/24/00, Jones Beach Amphitheater, Wantagh, New York
"Untitled"
10/22/00, MGM Grand Arena, Las Vegas
"MFC"
10/22/00, MGM Grand Arena, Las Vegas
"Thin Air"
10/21/00, Desert Sky Pavilion, Phoenix, Arizona
"Leatherman"
11/6/00, KeyArena, Seattle
"Better Man"
11/6/00, KeyArena, Seattle
"Nothingman"
11/6/00, KeyArena, Seattle
"Insignificance"
10/31/00, Shoreline Amphitheatre, Mountain View, California
"I Got Id"
10/4/00, Molson Centre, Montreal, Quebec, Canada
"Rearviewmirror"
11/6/00, KeyArena, Seattle
"Wishlist"
8/15/00, Pyramid Arena, Memphis, Tennessee
"Jeremy"
10/25/00, San Diego Sports Arena, San Diego
"Do the Evolution"
10/28/00, Blockbuster Pavilion, Devore, California
"Go"
11/3/00, Idaho Center, Nampa, Idaho
"Parting Ways"
10/18/00, United Spirit Arena, Lubbock, Texas
"Rockin' in the Free World"
10/20/00, Mesa Del Sol Amphitheatre, Albuquerque, New Mexico
The end credits are set to "Leaving Here" taken from 6/12/00, Pinkpop, Landgraaf, Netherlands.

Bonus features
Europe Montages
"The Cities" (Set to "Thunderclap")
"The Band" (Set to "Foldback" and "Harmony")
"The Fans" (Set to "Yellow Ledbetter" taken from 6/26/00, Alsterdorfer Sporthalle, Hamburg, Germany)
"Smile" (Audio taken from 8/25/00, Jones Beach Amphitheater, Wantagh, New York, with montage of outtakes of the band)
Bonus Videos
"Oceans" video (Never before released in the U.S.)
"Do the Evolution" video

Matt Cam songs
"Evacuation"
8/12/00, Ice Palace, Tampa, Florida
"Even Flow"
9/1/00, Blockbuster Music Entertainment Centre, Camden, New Jersey
"In My Tree"
8/30/00, Tweeter Center Boston, Mansfield, Massachusetts

Personnel

Pearl Jam
Jeff Ament – bass guitar
Matt Cameron – drums
Stone Gossard – guitar
Mike McCready – guitar
Eddie Vedder – vocals, guitar

Production
Liz Burns, Kevin Shuss – filming
John Burton – engineering
Brett Eliason – recording and mixing
Steve Gordon – filming, editing
Todd McFarlane – animation on "Do the Evolution" video
Josh Taft – direction on "Oceans" video

Chart positions

References

External links
Touring Band 2000 information at pearljam.com

Pearl Jam video albums
Pearl Jam live albums
2001 video albums
2001 live albums
Live video albums
Epic Records live albums
Epic Records video albums
Albums recorded at the Greek Theatre (Los Angeles)